1222 Tina, provisional designation , is a metallic asteroid and parent body of the Tina family located in the intermediate asteroid belt, approximately 25 kilometers in diameter. It was discovered on 11 June 1932, by Belgian astronomer Eugène Delporte at Uccle Observatory in Belgium. It was named after a friend of the discoverer.

Classification and orbit 

Tina is the namesake of the Tina family a group of 17–89 asteroids that form a small, well-defined asteroid family, which share similar spectral properties and orbital elements; hence they may have arisen from the same collisional event of two larger parent bodies. All members have a relatively high orbital inclination. The Tina family is unique because of its resonant nature: all its members are in anti-aligned librating states of the ν6 secular resonance, i.e., the longitudes of pericenter of the asteroids follow the longitudes of pericenter of Saturn by 180 degrees. This orbital configuration protects the asteroids from achieving high eccentricities and experiencing close encounters with terrestrial planets, forming a stable in a region strongly perturbed by the ν6 secular resonance. The family is estimated to be relatively young, about  million years old, and will most likely disperse to unstable regions in timescales of 200 million years.

It orbits the Sun at a distance of 2.1–3.5 AU once every 4 years and 8 months (1,707 days). Its orbit has an eccentricity of 0.25 and an inclination of 20° with respect to the ecliptic. The body's observation arc begins with its official discovery observation as no precoveries were taken, and no prior identifications were made.

Physical characteristics

Diameter and albedo 
According to the surveys carried out by the Infrared Astronomical Satellite IRAS, the Japanese Akari satellite, and NASA's Wide-field Infrared Survey Explorer with its subsequent NEOWISE mission, Tina measures between 20.84 and 26.28 kilometers in diameter and its surface has an albedo between 0.199 and 0.308 (without preliminary results). The Collaborative Asteroid Lightcurve Link derives an albedo of 0.1445 and a diameter of 20.12 kilometers using an absolute magnitude of 11.2.

Spectral type 

In the SMASS taxonomy, Tina is an X-type asteroid, while it is classified as a metal-rich M-type asteroid by the WISE-survey.

Rotation period 

Tina has a well-defined rotation period of 13.395 hours with a brightness variation of 0.18 magnitude, derived from photometric observations taken by American astronomer Brian Warner at his Palmer Divide Observatory, Colorado, in September 2007 (also see ). Other lightcurves were obtained by French amateur astronomers Pierre Antonini and Jean-Gabriel Bosch, which gave a period of 17.164 hours and an amplitude of 0.30 magnitude.

Naming 

This minor planet was named after "Tina", an amateur astronomer and friend of the discoverer. In 1955, naming citation was published by Paul Herget in The Names of the Minor Planets.

References

External links 
  
 Lightcurve plot of 1222 Tina, Palmer Divide Observatory, B. D. Warner (2007)
 Asteroid Lightcurve Database (LCDB), query form (info )
 Dictionary of Minor Planet Names, Google books
 Asteroids and comets rotation curves, CdR – Observatoire de Genève, Raoul Behrend
 Discovery Circumstances: Numbered Minor Planets (1)-(5000) – Minor Planet Center
 
 

 

001222
Discoveries by Eugène Joseph Delporte
Named minor planets
001222
19320611